Moti Mahal is a restaurant. After the partition of India in 1947, the Moti Mahal in Delhi was founded by Kundan Lal Gujral, Kundan Lal Jaggi and Thakur Dass as one of the first restaurants to introduce the Punjabi cuisine to the rest of the world.

History 
Moti Mahal was founded by Kundan Lal Gujral, Thakur Dass and Kundan Lal Jaggi, in Delhi in 1947. They worked at a small eatery called Moti Mahal, owned by a man named Mokha Singh in Peshawar, British India, from the 1920s to 1947.

After the partition of India in 1947, they fled to Delhi with their families. In Delhi, the three partners bought a thara (booth) in the Daryaganj area, then considered a newer part of Old Delhi and then they started Moti Mahal, Daryaganj 
Moti Mahal further went on to invent butter chicken and dal makhani.

References

Moti Mahal
Restaurants in Delhi
Punjabi cuisine